Josef Vojtek (born 21 June 1965 in Teplice) is a Czech rock singer. He has been the lead singer of the Czech band Kabát since 1988. He was a judge on The Voice Česko Slovensko from 2012 to 2019. He won a Thalia Award in 2016 for his role in the musical ''Mefisto.

References 

1965 births
Living people
People from Teplice
20th-century Czech male singers
Czech musicians
Recipients of the Thalia Award
21st-century Czech male singers